Oreonectes acridorsalis is a species of cyprinid of the genus Oreonectes. It inhabits caves in Guangxi, China. It was described by Lan in 2013 and has not been classified on the IUCN Red List.

References

Cyprinid fish of Asia
Freshwater fish of China
Fish described in 2013